Somewhere Between Heaven and Hell is the fourth studio album by the American punk rock band Social Distortion, released on February 11, 1992. Following up on the surprise success of their breakthrough singles "Ball and Chain" and "Story of My Life", Somewhere Between Heaven and Hell became a popular album and received positive reviews from music critics. It also spawned their highest-charting single "Bad Luck", which peaked at number 2 on the Modern Rock Tracks chart.

Somewhere Between Heaven and Hell was the one of the best-selling albums of Social Distortion's recording career, achieving gold sales certification in the United States by 2000, and by 1996, the album had sold 296,000 copies. It peaked at number 76 on the US Billboard 200 and topped the Heatseekers chart, and was also Social Distortion's last to feature drummer Christopher Reece, who left the band in 1994.

The cover art features Ness mid-jump, while playing one of his Gibson Les Pauls. The cover is reminiscent and possibly an hommage to Joan Jett jumping with her Gibson MelodyMaker over a canary yellow background on her third album, Album.

Music style
Somewhere Between Heaven and Hell continues the melding of country and rockabilly influences with punk that began with Social Distortion's 1988 album Prison Bound. Clear influences include Hank Williams (on "This Time Darlin'") and Johnny Cash (on "99 to Life").

Reception

Reviews for Somewhere Between Heaven and Hell have generally been favorable. AllMusic's Paul Tinelli awards the album four-and-a-half stars out of five and praised the music as a "share of rollicking, straight-ahead hard rock." He also claims that Somewhere Between Heaven and Hell "had all the earmarks of a major commercial success with some radio friendly tunes and strong production, but it never found the large audience Epic Records expected."

Covers
In 2008, Danish rock band Volbeat released a cover of “Making Believe” on their third album, Guitar Gangsters & Cadillac Blood. In 2018, the German punk rock band Die Toten Hosen covered the song "Cold Feelings" on their "Laune der Natur" single.

Track listing
All songs written by Mike Ness unless otherwise noted.
 "Cold Feelings" – 3:31
 "Bad Luck" – 4:26
 "Making Believe" (Jimmy Work) – 4:12
 "Born to Lose" – 4:09
 "Bye Bye Baby" – 3:06
 "When She Begins" – 5:04
 "99 to Life" – 4:28
 "King of Fools" (W.E. Bruce) – 2:50
 "Sometimes I Do" – 4:01
 "This Time Darlin' " – 4:08
 "Ghost Town Blues" – 4:38 (CD bonus track)
 "Alone and Forsaken" - 3:12 (Hank Williams; Japanese bonus track)
 "Mainliner 1992" - 2:59 (Japanese bonus track)

Track 11, "Ghost Town Blues", is a CD bonus track and it did not appear on the cassette or vinyl version of the album.

Personnel
 Mike Ness – lead vocals, lead guitar
 Dennis Danell – rhythm guitar
 John Maurer – bass guitar, backing vocals
 Christopher Reece – drums

Charts

Album

Singles

Certifications

Notes

External links
'Bye Bye Baby' song of the day on thishereboogie.com 20 November 2008

Social Distortion albums
1992 albums
Epic Records albums
Albums produced by Dave Jerden